Abraham Brumberg (November 7, 1926 – January 26, 2008) was an American writer and editor.

He wrote about the Soviet Union, Eastern Europe, and Jewish issues. He was the first editor of Problems of Communism (1952–1970), an author of numerous articles and essays (published in The New York Times, Dissent, The New Republic and other outlets), and the editor of several anthologies. Fluent in Yiddish, he was also an activist for preservation of that language.

Brumberg was born in Tel Aviv and lived in Poland as a child.

Works
Journeys Through Vanishing Worlds (New Academia, 2007) - memoir

External links
"Abraham Brumberg; Scholar Wrote About Judaism, Communism and Eastern Europe", Obituary, Washington Post, 16 February 2008
"Abraham Brumberg, Writer on Eastern Europe, Is Dead at 81", Obituary, The New York Times, 7 February 2008
"Abraham Brumberg", Obituary, The Guardian, 12 December 2008
Some articles by Brumberg at NYBooks.com

1926 births
2008 deaths
Israeli anti-communists
Israeli emigrants to the United States
Israeli Ashkenazi Jews
Jewish American writers
People from Tel Aviv
20th-century American Jews
21st-century American Jews